The Palk Strait ( Pākku Nīriṇai,  Pok Samudra Sandhiya) is a strait between the Tamil Nadu state of India and the Jaffna District of the Northern Province of the island nation of Sri Lanka. It connects the Bay of Bengal in the northeast with Palk Bay in the southwest. With a minimum depth of less than 9.1 m, it is 40 to 85 miles (64 to 137 km) wide and 85 miles long. Several rivers flow into it, including the Vaigai River of Tamil Nadu. The strait is named after Robert Palk, who was a governor of Madras (1755–1763) during the Company Raj period.

The unique feature around Palk Strait is that the waves around it, to its north and south are of high contrast. To the north, the waves of Bay of Bengal are mostly swells waves while that on the south, in Palk Bay, are mostly sea waves. Despite being a sea dominated area, the significant wave heights in Palk Bay regions are relatively low. The average significant wave height in Palk Bay close to Ram Setu is around 0.5 m.

Geography 
Palk Bay is studded at its southern end with a chain of low islands and reef shoals that are collectively called Ram Setu, it has historically been known in Hindu Mythology as "Ram Setu", that is, the bridge of Rama. This chain extends between Dhanushkodi on Pamban Island (also known as Rameswaram Island) in Tamil Nadu and Mannar Island in Sri Lanka. The island of Rameswaram is linked to the Indian mainland by the Pamban Bridge.

History 
In 1914, there used to be regular trains from Madras/Chennai to Dhanushkodi, a ferry to Talaimannar on Mannar Island, and then a train to Colombo. In 1964, a cyclone destroyed Dhanushkodi and the railway and caused severe damage along the shores of Palk Strait and Palk Bay. Dhanushkodi was not rebuilt and the railway from Talaimannar to Mahawilachchiya in Sri Lanka was given up due to the civil war (It was later completely rebuilt). At least into the 1970s there was a ferry between small piers in Rameswaram and Talaimannar, but this was discontinued. Ferry service briefly resumed around 2010 but at this time there are no passenger connections across the Strait.

Proposed canal 
The shallow waters and reefs of the strait make it difficult for large ships to pass through, although fishing boats and small craft carrying coastal trade have navigated the strait for centuries. Large ships must travel around Sri Lanka. Construction of a shipping canal through the strait was first proposed to the British government of India in 1860, and a number of commissions have studied the proposal up to the present day. The most recent study of the Sethusamudram Shipping Canal Project, as it is now called, was an environmental impact assessment and a technical feasibility study commissioned by the Tamil Nadu government in 2004.

However, the plan encountered opposition from various religious circles. The Indian epic poem Ramayana, written thousands of years ago in Sanskrit and an important Hindu text, recounts how Rama, with the help of an army of vanaras, built a bridge of stones across the sea to Lanka to rescue his wife Sita from the Asura king Ravana. The Ram Karmabhoomi movement, encouraged by a NASA satellite photograph of Rama's Setu, was formed to prevent the shipping canal from being built.

Fixed link 

The construction of an Undersea Bed Rail tunnel linking India and Sri Lanka has been proposed that will pass below the Palk Strait.

See also
 Andaman and Nicobar Command
 Andaman Sea
 Coral reefs in India
 Borders of India
 Exclusive economic zone of India

References

External links 

 Photo essay on the Palk Strait.

 
Bodies of water of Jaffna District
India–Sri Lanka border
International straits
Landforms of Tamil Nadu
Straits of India
Straits of Sri Lanka